Alta Sierra (Spanish for "Upper Range") is a census-designated place (CDP) in Nevada County, California, United States.  The population was 6,911 at the 2010 census, up from 6,522 at the 2000 census.

History
Alta Sierra was laid out by property developers in the 1960s. Alta Sierra is a golf course community, with homes built around the Alta Sierra Country Club, a semi-private 18 hole course built in 1964. The community has a member-owned airport with a 2800 foot runway. The community is located just east of California State Highway 49, at an elevation of approximately 2300 feet, between the cities of Grass Valley, California to the north and Auburn, California to the south. There is a small commercial district with several restaurants, a gas station, a market and personal service businesses. There is also an elementary school and a motel.

Geography
Alta Sierra is located at  (39.128952, -121.052442).

There is also another community called Alta Sierra in northcentral Kern County, CA near Lake Isabella.

Climate

Demographics

2010
The 2010 United States Census reported that Alta Sierra had a population of 6,911. The racial makeup of Alta Sierra was 6,436 (93.1%) White, 18 (0.3%) African American, 55 (0.8%) Native American, 73 (1.1%) Asian, 9 (0.1%) Pacific Islander, 122 (1.8%) from other races, and 198 (2.9%) from two or more races. Hispanic or Latino of any race were 488 persons (7.1%).

The Census reported that 6,890 people (99.7% of the population) lived in households, 0 (0%) lived in non-institutionalized group quarters, and 21 (0.3%) were institutionalized.

There were 2,830 households, out of which 726 (25.7%) had children under the age of 18 living in them, 1,794 (63.4%) were opposite-sex married couples living together, 197 (7.0%) had a female householder with no husband present, 109 (3.9%) had a male householder with no wife present.  There were 127 (4.5%) unmarried opposite-sex partnerships, and 29 (1.0%) same-sex married couples or partnerships. 580 households (20.5%) were made up of individuals, and 305 (10.8%) had someone living alone who was 65 years of age or older. The average household size was 2.43.  There were 2,100 families (74.2% of all households); the average family size was 2.78.

The population was spread out, with 1,345 people (19.5%) under the age of 18, 401 people (5.8%) aged 18 to 24, 1,208 people (17.5%) aged 25 to 44, 2,339 people (33.8%) aged 45 to 64, and 1,618 people (23.4%) who were 65 years of age or older.  The median age was 49.8 years. For every 100 females, there were 97.5 males.  For every 100 females age 18 and over, there were 94.7 males.

The homeowner vacancy rate was 2.4%; the rental vacancy rate was 5.1%.  5,654 people (81.8% of the population) lived in owner-occupied housing units and 1,236 people (17.9%) lived in rental housing units.

2000
As of the census of 2000, there were 6,522 people, 2,577 households, and 2,084 families residing in the CDP. The racial makeup of the CDP was 95.94% White, 0.29% Black or African American, 0.57% Native American, 0.74% Asian, 0.09% Pacific Islander, 0.64% from other races, and 1.73% from two or more races.  4.14% of the population were Hispanic or Latino of any race.

There were 2,577 households, out of which 27.0% had children under the age of 18 living with them, 72.4% were married couples living together, 6.4% had a female householder with no husband present, and 19.1% were non-families. 15.3% of all households were made up of individuals, and 8.7% had someone living alone who was 65 years of age or older.  The average household size was 2.53 and the average family size was 2.78.

In the CDP, the population was spread out, with 21.7% under the age of 18, 4.2% from 18 to 24, 20.0% from 25 to 44, 30.1% from 45 to 64, and 24.0% who were 65 years of age or older.  The median age was 47 years. For every 100 females, there were 97.5 males.  For every 100 females age 18 and over, there were 93.7 males.

The median income for a household in the CDP was $56,868, and the median income for a family was $59,776. Males had a median income of $47,121 versus $31,302 for females. The per capita income for the CDP was $28,876.  About 3.2% of families and 4.3% of the population were below the poverty line, including 2.1% of those under age 18 and 3.6% of those age 65 or over.

Politics

References

External links
 Alta Sierra Property Owner's Association  provides local information about the area.

Census-designated places in Nevada County, California
Census-designated places in California